Fîrlădeni is a commune in Căușeni District, Moldova. It is composed of two villages, Fîrlădeni and Fîrlădenii Noi.

References

Communes of Căușeni District